The A5199 road is the direct road from Northampton to Leicester in England. It was formerly part of the A50 trunk road that ran from Bedfordshire to Lancashire.  For most of its length it is known as the Welford Road, except for small stretches near Welford where it is known as High Street and Northampton Road, and a section near Wigston Magna where it is known as Bull Head Street.

As its course is broadly parallel and near to the M1 motorway, it's very much lacking in modern features such as bypasses, which is why it was classified downwards when the A14 road, which it crosses at Junction 1, was built as a link between the M1/M6 junction and the East Coast ports.

Settlements on the A5199 
The road commences in the Freemen's district of inner city Leicester at the junction with the A594 Leicester Central Ring.

North to South
City of Leicester
Clarendon Park
Knighton
Leicestershire
Wigston Fields
Wigston
Kilby Bridge
Husbands Bosworth
Northamptonshire
Welford
Thornby
Creaton
Spratton
Chapel Brampton

It terminates at a junction with the A508 in the Northampton suburb of Kingsthorpe.

External links 

Roads in England
Transport in Leicestershire
Transport in Northamptonshire